Nationality words link to articles with information on the nation's poetry or literature (for instance, Irish or France).

Events
 The remains of English war poet Isaac Rosenberg, killed in World War I (1918) at the age of 28 and originally buried in a mass grave, are re-interred at Bailleul Road East Cemetery, Plot V, St. Laurent-Blangy, Pas de Calais, France.
 Poetry Bookshop in Bloomsbury, London, closes

Works published

Canada
 William Henry Drummond, Complete Poems, posthumously published.
 Wilson MacDonald, Out Of The Wilderness. Ottawa: Graphic Publishers.
 E. J. Pratt, Titans ("The Cachalot, The Great Feud"), Toronto: Macmillan.
 Theodore Goodridge Roberts, The Lost Shipmate. Toronto: Ryerson Chapbook.
 Duncan Campbell Scott, Collected Poems.
 Frederick George Scott, In Sun and Shade: A Book of Verse] (Québec: Dussault & Proulx).

India in English
Swami Anand Acharya, Arctic Swallows and Other Poems ( Poetry in English ),
 The Spirit of Oriental Poetry, London: Kegal Paul, Trench, Trubner & Co., 232 pages; anthology; published in the United Kingdom
 Krishnala M. Jhaveri, Further Milestones in Gujarati Literature written in English and translated into Gujarati; scholarship and criticism

United Kingdom
 Frank Ashton-Gwatkin (as John Paris), A Japanese Don Juan and other Poems
 Edmund Blunden, English Poems
 W. H. Davies, The Birth of Song
 Loyd Haberly, Cymberina, American poet self-published in the United Kingdom
 Hugh MacDiarmid, pen name of Christopher Murray Grieve:
 A Drunk Man Looks at the Thistle
 Penny Wheep
 Edwin Muir, Chorus of the Newly Dead
 Laura Riding, The Close Chaplet
 Vita Sackville-West, The Land
 Siegfried Sassoon, Satirical Poems
 Kenneth Slessor, Earth-Visitors, London: Fanfrolico Press, Australian poet published in the United Kingdom
 The Spirit of Oriental Poetry, London: Kegal Paul, Trench, Trubner & Co., 232 pages; anthology; Indian poetry in English, published in the United Kingdom
 Humbert Wolfe:
 Humoresque
 News of the Devil
 W. B. Yeats, Autobiographies (autobiography), volume 6 of the Collected Edition published by Macmillan

United States

 Willa Cather, My Mortal Enemy
 Hart Crane, White Buildings
 Countee Cullen, On These I Stand, Harper & Row
 E. E. Cummings, is 5
 John Gould Fletcher, Branches of Adam
 Langston Hughes, The Weary Blues
 Vachel Lindsay:
 Going to the Stars
 The Candle in the Cabin
 Amy Lowell, East Wind
 Archibald MacLeish, Streets in the Moon, including "The End of the World"
 Edgar Lee Masters, Lee: A Dramatic Poem
 John G. Neihardt, Collected Poems
 Dorothy Parker, Enough Rope
 Ezra Pound, Personae: The Collected Poems
 Sara Teasdale, Dark of the Moon
 Edith Wharton, Twelve Poems
 Louis Zukofsky completes "Poem beginning 'The'," incorporating fragments of the writings of Dante, Virginia Woolf, and Benito Mussolini, among others

Other in English
 W. F. Alexander and A. E. Currie, editors, A Treasury of New Zealand Verse, revised version  (without preface) of New Zealand Verse, published in 1906, anthology
 Kenneth Slessor, Earth-Visitors, London: Fanfrolico Press, Australian poet published in the United Kingdom

Works published in other languages

France
 Louis Aragon, Le Mouvement Perpetuel, influenced by Surrealism
 Paul Éluard, pen name of Paul-Eugène Grindel:
 Dessous d'une vie
 Capitale de la douleur ("Capital of Pain"); the poems influenced Jean-Luc Godard's 1965 film Alphaville, une étrange aventure de Lemmy Caution which has quotations from the book
 Francis Jammes, Ma France poétique, Paris: Mercure de France; France
 Pierre Jean Jouve:
 Mystérieuses Noces
 Nouvelles Noces

Indian subcontinent
Including all of the British colonies that later became India, Pakistan, Bangladesh, Sri Lanka and Nepal. Listed alphabetically by first name, regardless of surname:
 Ahmad Din, Iqbal, a critical work on the poetry of Sir Mohammad Iqbal, Indian, Urdu-language
 Mohanlal Dalicand Desai, Jain Gurjar Kavio, Volume 1, literary history written in Gujarati, delving into Jain poets and including a list of manuscripts; in 1995, Indian literary scholar Sisir Kumar Das called it a "veru useful and important ork for students of Gujarati literature" (see also Volume 2 in 1931, Volume 3 1964)
 Ramanbhai Nilkanth, Kavita Ane Sahitya, four volumes of Gujarati poetry and prose; Volume 1, articles on prosody and rhetoric; Volume 2, articles on practical criticism; Volume 3, occasional lectures and essays; Volume 4 (published in 1929), some poems, short stories and essays on humor
 S. Sonusundara Bharati, Tacaratan Kuraiyum Kaikeyi Niraiyum, literary criticism in Tamil

Spanish language

Peru
 Enrique Bustamante y Ballivián, Antipoemas
 Alejandro Peralta, Ande
 Enrique Peña Barrenechea, El aroma en la sombra

Other in Spanish
 Rafael Alberti, La amante ("The Beloved"); Spain
 Germán List Arzubide, El movimiento estridentista, Mexico (history)
 Federico García Lorca, Oda a Salvador Dalí ("Ode to Salvador Dalí"), Spain
 Xavier Villaurrutia, Reflejos, Mexico

Other languages
 Uri Zvi Greenberg, Ha-Gavrut Ha-Olah ("Manhood on the Rise"), Hebrew language, Mandatory Palestine
 Tin Ujević, Kolajna ("Necklace"), Croatian

Awards and honors
 Pulitzer Prize for Poetry: Amy Lowell, What's O'Clock

Births
Death years link to the corresponding "[year] in poetry" article:
 January 5 – W. D. Snodgrass (died 2009), American poet, academic and winner of the Pulitzer Prize for Poetry in 1960
 February 4 – Albert Saijo (died 2011), Japanese-American poet
 February 18 – A. R. Ammons (died 2001), American author and poet
 February 25 – Russell Atkins, African-American concrete poet, musician and playwright
 March 3 – James Merrill (died 1995), American poet and winner of the Pulitzer Prize for Poetry in 1977
 March 22 – Alastair Reid (died 2014), Scottish poet and scholar of South American literature
 April 18 – Niranjan Bhagat (died 2018), Indian poet and critic writing in Gujarati and English
 May 4 – Allen Mandelbaum (died 2011), American poet and translator
 May 21 – Robert Creeley (died 2005),  American poet and author associated with the Black Mountain poets
 May 26 – Phyllis Gotlieb (died 2009), Canadian science fiction novelist and poet
 June 3 – Allen Ginsberg (died 1997), American Beat poet
 June 5 – David Wagoner, American poet and novelist
 June 25 – Ingeborg Bachmann (died 1973), Austrian poet and author
 June 27 – Frank O'Hara (died 1966), American poet and key member of the New York School of poetry
 June 29 – James K. Baxter (died 1972), New Zealand poet
 July 7 – Anand Mohan Zutshi Gulzar Dehlvi (died 2020), Indian Urdu poet
 July 17 – Nikos Karouzos (died 1990), Greek poet
 July 18 – Elizabeth Jennings (died 2001), English poet
 August 15 – Sukanta Bhattacharya (died 1947), Bengali poet and playwright
 September 1 – James Reaney (died 2008), Canadian poet, playwright and literary critic
 November 5 – John Berger (died 2017), English novelist, painter, art critic and poet
 November 11 – José Manuel Caballero (died 2021) Spanish poet and novelist
 November 23 – Christopher Logue (died 2011), English poet, playwright, screen writer and actor associated with the British Poetry Revival
 November 24 – Paul Blackburn (died 1971), American poet
 December 23 – Robert Bly, American poet, author and leader of the mythopoetic men's movement in the United States
 December 26 – Nabakanta Barua, also known as Ekhud Kokaideu (died 2002), Assamese-language Indian novelist and poet

Deaths
Birth years link to the corresponding "[year] in poetry" article:
 January 10 – Eino Leino, 47 (born 1878), Finnish poet and journalist
 January 20 – Charles Montagu Doughty, 82 (born 1843), English poet, writer and traveller
 April 7 – Ozaki Hōsai 尾崎 放哉 pen name of Ozaki Hideo, 41 (born 1885), Japanese late Meiji period and Taishō period poet (surname of this pen name: Ozaki)
 May 30 – Perceval Gibbon, 46 (born 1879), Welsh-born journalist, short-story writer and poet
 June 15 – Francis Joseph Sherman, 55 (born 1871), Canadian poet
 July 19 – Ada Cambridge (married name was Cross, but she kept her maiden name as her pen name), 81 (born 1844), English writer and poet living in Australia after 1870
 August 1 – Israel Zangwill, 62 (born 1864), English writer and poet
 October 9 – Helena Nyblom, 82 (born 1843), Danish-born poet and writer of fairy tales
 November 17 – George Sterling, 56 (born 1869), American poet
 December 29 – Rainer Maria Rilke, 51 (born 1875), German poet, from leukemia

See also

 Poetry
 List of poetry awards
 List of years in poetry
 New Objectivity in German literature and art

Notes

20th-century poetry
Poetry